The Battle of Katole was a military engagement between forces of Portuguese Angola and the Kingdom of Matamba. The battle took place on 4 September 1681 at Katole in what is today Angola. It was one of the largest military engagements anywhere in the world during the 17th century.

Prelude to Battle
The kingdom of Matamba, also known as the kingdom of Matamba and Ndongo, lay in what is today eastern Angola. It was created by the warrior queen Nzinga via her 1631 conquest of the kingdom from its BaKongo vassal. Throughout the mid-17th century, Queen Nzinga fought a guerilla war against the Portuguese colony of Angola to regain her throne and protect her people, the Mbundu, from the slave trade. By 1657, the queen had regained her traditional capital and ended the wars with Angola in her favor. After her death in 1663, the kingdom she fought so hard to establish devolved into civil war. The war did not end until 1680 when Francisco Guterres Ngola kannini, Njinga's nephew, defeated one of his aunt's former commanders and became king.

Casus Belli
In 1681, King Francisco invaded the neighboring Imbangala kingdom of Kassanje to place his own candidate on the throne. While on campaign, he robbed the pombeiros, Afro-Portuguese slaving agents, and beheaded the kingdom's ruler. This angered the Portuguese, who had never been comfortable with an independent Matamba in the first place. The Portuguese immediately sent the victor of Mbwila, Luís Lopes de Sequeira, to crush the kingdom once and for all.

The battle
On September 4, 1681, Sequeira arrived at Katole, which was but three days' march from the royal kabasa or palace. He came with over ten thousand infantry and even a small complement of horses (almost unheard of in Central African warfare). He was met by King Francisco's forces sometime before dawn that day. In the course of the fighting, both Sequeira and Francisco were killed. Matamba's forces retreated, and the Portuguese were able to claim at least a tactical victory by holding their position.

Aftermath
Despite taking the field, which had never been an objective in the first place, the Portuguese losses were such that the invasion of Matamba's capital was called off. After encamping at Katole for nearly thirty days, the Portuguese and their African allies retired to Mbaka under the command of João António de Brito.

See also
History of Angola
Kingdom of Matamba
African military systems to 1800

References

Sources

Katole 1681
Katole
Katole
1681 in Africa
Conflicts in 1681
Portuguese Angola